Hyperolius inyangae, commonly known as the Nyanga long reed frog, is a species of frog in the family Hyperoliidae. 

The current described range is limited to the Nyanga National Park in Zimbabwe, which it is named after. It inhabits a range of watery sites in highland areas along the eastern Zimbabwe-Mozambique border.

References 

Frogs of Africa
Amphibians described in 2013
inyangae